The .460 S&W Magnum round is a powerful revolver cartridge designed for long-range handgun hunting in the Smith & Wesson Model 460 revolver.

Overview
The .460 S&W round is a lengthened, more powerful version of the popular .454 Casull, itself a longer and more powerful version of the .45 Colt. For this reason, the .460 S&W Magnum could be considered an example of a "super magnum". Consequently, firearms that fire .460 S&W are usually capable of firing the less powerful .454 Casull, .45 Colt, and .45 Schofield rounds, but this must be verified with each firearm's manufacturer. For instance, some lever-action firearms are designed to handle cartridges within a certain length and bullet profile range. The reverse, however, does not apply: .45 Schofield, .45 Colt, and .454 Casull handguns generally cannot safely fire .460 S&W rounds — nor can they even chamber the .460 S&W because of the longer case length. It is also the most versatile big-bore revolver being able to fire four standardized cartridges, as well as lesser-known rimmed and straightwall cartridges of .45 caliber that predate the .45 Colt. The .460 S&W is built to handle both long-range hunting and defensive performance.

Performance
The .460 cartridge achieves high velocities by operating at chamber pressures (65,000 psi max) normally reserved for magnum rifle cartridges. The recoil when shooting .45 Colt ammunition out of the Smith & Wesson Model 460 is comparable to recoil from a 9mm or .380 load, due to the weight of the gun and lower chamber pressures. Since firearms chambered in .460 S&W can also fire cartridges of dissimilar trajectories, such as .45 Colt, S&W provides an additional rear sight with the gun to compensate for bullet drop down range, depending on the user's load and shooting applications.

Long guns

Big Horn Armory's Model 90 carbine and rifle are currently the only repeating long guns chambered in this cartridge. The .460 S&W typically produces an additional 200-400 feet per second through long guns. This extra velocity flattens the trajectory and increases energy. The Ruger No. 1 single-shot rifle is also offered in .460 S&W, as well as the Thompson Center Encore Pro Hunter Katahdin single-shot rifle.

See also

References

External links
 
 Guns & Ammo article on the S&W .460 XVR
 Reloading S&W .460 

Magnum pistol cartridges
Pistol and rifle cartridges
Rimmed cartridges
Smith & Wesson cartridges